Tulan Qaghan (Chinese: 都蘭可汗/都兰可汗, Pinyin: dōulán kěhàn, Wade-Giles: tu-lan k'o-han, Middle Chinese (Guangyun): , personal name: 阿史那雍虞閭/阿史那雍虞闾, āshǐnà yōngyúlǘ, a-shih-na yung-yü-lü) was the son of Ishbara Qaghan and the seventh qaghan (Khaqan) of the Turkic Khaganate.

Reign 
In 593 he collected enough power to stop paying taxes to Emperor Wendi. Secretly, Princess Qianjin plotted with khagan's rival Tuli (who claimed to throne in 593) to attack the Sui Empire when her husband refused. This plot was exposed by Chang sun-sheng, a spy of the Sui Empire. He combined his forces with Tardu in 599 and launched invasion on Sui, however he was assassinated by his own men in 599.

Family 
He married his father's wife, Northern Zhou's Princess Qianjin, now known under the Sui Dynasty title Princess Dayi. Her new name was given to her by the Sui Emperor Wendi in order to create a marriage alliance with the Turks.

References 

Göktürk khagans
599 deaths
Ashina house of the Turkic Empire
6th-century Turkic people
Year of birth unknown